Tripob Shushuenklin is a Thai retired footballer.

References

Living people
Tripob Shushuenklin
1979 births
Association football midfielders
Tripob Shushuenklin
Tripob Shushuenklin
Tripob Shushuenklin
Tripob Shushuenklin